The Kel-Tec PF-9 is a 9 mm caliber, recoil operated, locked breech, double action only, semi-automatic pistol based on (and sharing many parts with) Kel-Tec's earlier P-11 and P-3AT models. Kel-Tec claims the PF-9 is the flattest and lightest 9 mm pistol ever mass-produced. It was designed as a concealment and backup weapon for law enforcement and for civilian concealed carry. Kel-Tec first announced the PF-9 on February 9, 2006, and the new pistol was released into the market in the fall of 2006.  The PF9 was discontinued following the introduction of the P15.

Design details
The PF-9 is manufactured in Cocoa, Florida, by Kel-Tec CNC Industries. Featuring extensive use of computer numerical control (CNC) manufacturing techniques, its six main components consist of the barrel, slide, frame, grip, trigger group, and magazine. The barrel is manufactured of SAE/AISI 4140 steel hardened to 48 RHC, and the slide is constructed of the same steel. The trigger group consists of a solid machined 7075-T56 aluminum billet.  A transfer bar system connects the hammer and trigger. A firing pin block safety is incorporated which prevents accidental discharge if the pistol is dropped. The long double-action-only trigger pull provides an additional safety feature. The pistol includes a slide hold-open feature which locks the slide in its rearmost position after the last round is fired.  The frame is made of DuPont ST-8018 polymer and holds the steel, 7-round, single-column magazine.  The sights consist of a fixed front blade and a windage-adjustable notched rear sight.  Three white dots highlight the sights for optimum visibility in low-light conditions, and this gun includes an accessory rail for mounting lights and lasers.

The PF-9 uses many parts originally designed for Kel-Tec's P-11 and P-3AT models, and is a compromise between those pistols.  From the P-11, the PF-9 uses a slightly modified barrel, trigger, ejector, and front sight.  The P-3AT parts used in the PF-9 include the extractor and various springs. The grip is available in a variety of colors, while the slide is available in blued, Parkerized, ceramic (Cerakote), and hard chromed finishes. The PF-9 is shipped with an extended magazine floorplate, an Allen wrench for adjusting the rear sight, and an owner's manual.

References

External links
PF-9 page on Kel-Tec CNC Industries web site
Kel-Tec CNC Industries web site
Kel-Tec Owners Group (KTOG)

9mm Parabellum semi-automatic pistols
Semi-automatic pistols of the United States